Brusqeulia tineimorpha is a species of moth of the family Tortricidae. It is found in the Federal District of Brazil.

The wingspan is about 10 mm. The ground colour of the forewings is whitish cream, but the reticulation (net-like pattern) and some larger strigulae (fine streaks) are brownish. The hindwings are grey, but whiter basally.

Etymology
The specific name refers to its external similarity to a tineid moth.

References

Moths described in 2011
Brusqeulia
Moths of South America
Taxa named by Józef Razowski